Minuscule 597 (in the Gregory-Aland numbering), ε 340 (von Soden), is a Greek minuscule manuscript of the New Testament, on parchment. Palaeographically it has been assigned to the 13th century. The manuscript has complex contents. It was labeled by Scrivener as 464.

Description 

The codex contains a complete text of the four Gospels on 259 parchment leaves (size ). The text is written in one column per page, 20-21 lines per page.

Text 

The Greek text of the codex is a representative of the Byzantine text-type. According to Scrivener it has remarkable readings, but Hermann von Soden classified it as Kx. Aland placed it in Category V. According to the Wisse's Profile Method it represents textual group 291 in Luke 1, Luke 10, and Luke 20.

History 

Formerly it was held in "Archivo" in Venice. The manuscript was added to the list of New Testament manuscripts by Scrivener. Dean Burgon collated 16 chapters in the several Gospels. Gregory saw it in 1886.

The manuscript currently is housed at the Biblioteca Marciana (Gr. I,59 (1277)), at Venice.

See also 

 List of New Testament minuscules
 Biblical manuscript
 Textual criticism

References

Further reading

External links 
 Minuscule 597 (GA) at the Encyclopedia Textual Criticism

Greek New Testament minuscules
13th-century biblical manuscripts